Ko Long is a village located in the area of Yung Shue Wan on the North side of Lamma Island, the third largest island in the territory of Hong Kong.

Administration
Ko Long is a recognized village under the New Territories Small House Policy.

References

External links

 Delineation of area of existing village Ko Long (Lamma North) for election of resident representative (2019 to 2022)

Villages in Islands District, Hong Kong
Lamma Island